James Edwin Graham Logan (born 12 October 1997) is an English professional cricketer who plays for Kent County Cricket Club. Logan played for Yorkshire between 2018 and 2020 before being released by the club at the end of the 2020 season.

Logan was born in Wakefield, West Yorkshire and played for Yorkshire's age group and Academy teams, as well as the club's Second XI. A slow left-arm orthodox spin bowler, he made his first-class debut for Yorkshire in the 2018 County Championship on 24 September 2018.

In his second first-class match against Warwickshire played at York's Clifton Park Ground in June 2019, Logan took four wickets for 22 runs in Warwickshire's second innings.

He was released by Yorkshire when his contract expired at the end of the 2020 season and signed a two-month contract with Kent in June 2021 after impressing playing in the county's Second XI. He made his Twenty20 debut on 9 June 2021, taking 1/14 from three overs on debut, and his List A debut on 22 July in the 2021 Royal London One-Day Cup. On 27 July 2021, Logan signed a two-year contract extension with Kent.

References

External links
 

1997 births
Living people
English cricketers
Yorkshire cricketers
Cricketers from Wakefield
English cricketers of the 21st century